16 Sagittarii is a multiple star system in the southern zodiac constellation of Sagittarius. It is near the lower limit of brightness for stars that can be seen with the naked eye, having an apparent visual magnitude of 6.02. The estimated distance to this system is about 4,600 light years. It is a member of the Sgr OB7 cluster. Along with the O-type star 15 Sgr, it is ionizing an H II region along the western edge of the molecular cloud L291.

Mason et al. (1998) found this to be a member of a speckle binary with an estimated orbital period of roughly 130 years and a magnitude difference of 0.4. Both components show indications of a variable radial velocity, suggesting that they are spectroscopic binaries – making it a candidate quadruple star system. However, Tokovinin (2008) considers it a triple star system.

Orbital elements for the main spectroscopic binary, components Aa and Ab, were published by Mayer et al. (2014), giving an orbital period of 12.76 days and an eccentricity of 0.18. This system displays a merged stellar classification of O9.5 III, matching a blue-hued O-type giant star. Tokovinin (2008) gives an estimated mass of 50 times the mass of the Sun for the primary, and 3.72 for the secondary. The tertiary member, component B, has 2.54 times the Sun's mass.

References

O-type giants
Spectroscopic binaries
Triple star systems
Sagittarius (constellation)
Durchmusterung objects
Sagittarii, 16
167263
089440